Claude Bourdelin (c. 1621 – 14 October 1699) was a French apothecary and a pioneer of iatrochemistry. He was among the first chemists, along with Samuel Cottereau du Clos, to serve in the French Academy of Sciences at the time of its founding in 1666, chosen by Jean-Baptiste Colbert on behalf of Louis XIV.

Bourdelin was born in Villefranche and lost his parents early after which he was raised by relatives in Paris. He taught himself Greek and Latin and became an assistant to the apothecary serving Gaston, Duke of Orléans. He then became an assistant of Philippe d'Orléans who served the Duke of Anjou. When the French Academy of Sciences was founded in 1666, Jean-Baptiste Colbert was assigned by Louis XIV to select members and he appointed Samuel Cottereau du Clos and Claude Bourdelin who were both associated with medicine. From 1667 Claude Perrault suggested a research program which included chemical studies. Bourdelin worked with Samuel Cottereau du Clos to analyze mineral waters (sampling ninety sources from 68 locations in France and the analysis was published in 1675), materials from plants and animals. The academy consisting of fifteen members would meet twice a week, Tuesdays for mathematics and Saturdays for physics. The examination of plant matter included distillation of liquids and attempts to separate mixtures and compounds.

References

External links 
 Cotterau du Clos, Samuel (1675) Observations sur les eaux minerales de plusieurs provinces de France. Paris: Imprimerie royale.

1621 births
1699 deaths
French chemists